Holiday Island may refer to:

 Holiday Island, Australian television series made by Crawford Productions for Network Ten
 Holiday Island (film), 1957 Italian comedy film 
 Holiday Island (1996 video game), business simulation video game developed by German games design company Sunflower
 Holiday Island, Arkansas, census-designated place in Carroll County, Arkansas, United States
 MV Holiday Island, Canadian RORO ferry that operates across the Northumberland Strait